The New Jersey Devils are a professional ice hockey team based in Newark, New Jersey, United States.  They are members of the Metropolitan Division of the National Hockey League's (NHL) Eastern Conference.  The Devils franchise has been a part of the NHL since 1974, when the team entered the league as the Kansas City Scouts.  Two years later, they moved to Denver, Colorado, and became the Colorado Rockies.  The team stayed there until 1982, when they moved to New Jersey. The team has had four general managers since the franchise moved to New Jersey.

Key

General managers

See also
List of NHL general managers

Notes
 A running total of the number of general managers of the franchise. Thus any general manager who has two or more separate terms as general manager is only counted once. General managers while the franchise was located in Kansas City and Colorado are not counted towards the total.

References

New Jersey Devils
 
New Jersey Devils general managers
executives